The 1980 Federation Cup was the 18th edition of the most important competition between national teams in women's tennis.  The tournament was held at the Rot-Weiss Tennis Club in West Berlin from 19–25 May. The United States won their fifth consecutive title, defeating Australia in their tenth and record eighth consecutive final. The US did not drop a single match during the tournament.

Participating Teams

Draw
All ties were played at the Rot-Weiss Tennis Club in West Berlin, on clay courts.

1st Round losing teams play in Consolation rounds

First round

United States vs. Poland

New Zealand vs. Mexico

Belgium vs. Italy

South Korea vs. Soviet Union

Switzerland vs. Denmark

Ireland vs. Romania

Canada vs. Yugoslavia

Hungary vs. Czechoslovakia

Great Britain vs. Israel

Argentina vs. Netherlands

Luxembourg vs. Spain

Austria vs. West Germany

France vs. Sweden

Japan vs. Thailand

Chinese Taipei vs. Indonesia

Norway vs. Australia

Second round

United States vs. New Zealand

Italy vs. Soviet Union

Switzerland vs. Romania

Yugoslavia vs. Czechoslovakia

Great Britain vs. Argentina

Spain vs. West Germany

Sweden vs. Japan

Indonesia vs. Australia

Quarterfinals

United States vs. Soviet Union

Romania vs. Czechoslovakia

Great Britain vs. West Germany

Sweden vs. Australia

Semifinals

United States vs. Czechoslovakia

West Germany vs. Australia

Final

United States vs. Australia

Consolation rounds

Draw

First round

Netherlands vs. Austria

Norway vs. Hungary

Canada vs. Mexico

Chinese Taipei vs. Poland

Thailand vs. Luxembourg

Ireland vs. South Korea

Belgium vs. Israel

Denmark vs. France

Quarterfinals

Netherlands vs. Hungary

Canada vs. Poland

Thailand vs. South Korea

Belgium vs. France

Semifinals

Netherlands vs. Canada

South Korea vs. France

Final

Canada vs. France

References

Billie Jean King Cups by year
Federation
Tennis tournaments in Germany
Sports competitions in West Berlin
1980s in West Berlin
1980 in women's tennis
1980 in West Germany